The 2006 Ju-Jitsu World Championship were the 7th edition of the Ju-Jitsu World Championships, and were held in Rotterdam, Netherlands from November 17 to November 19, 2006.

Schedule 
17.11.2006 – Men's and Women's Fighting System, Men's Duo System – Classic
18.11.2006 – Men's and Women's Fighting System, Women's Duo System – Classic
19.11.2006 – Men's and Women's Fighting System, Mixed Duo System – Classic

European Ju-Jitsu

Fighting System

Men's events

Women's events

Duo System

Duo Classic events

Links

References

External links
Live results
TOP6 results from JJIF site (PDF)